Global Crises, Global Solutions is a book presenting the methodology, economic papers and conclusions of the first Copenhagen Consensus, edited by Bjørn Lomborg, published in 2004 by the Cambridge University Press.

Danish non-fiction books
Books about economic crises
Political books
2004 non-fiction books
Cambridge University Press books